The isotypic component of weight  of a Lie algebra module is the sum of all submodules which are isomorphic to the highest weight module with weight .

Definition

 A finite-dimensional module  of a reductive Lie algebra  (or of the corresponding Lie group) can be decomposed into irreducible submodules
.
, where  denotes the highest weight module with highest weight .
.

This defines the isotypic component of weight  of V:
  where  is maximal.

See also
 Lie algebra representation
 Weight (representation theory)
 Semisimple representation#Isotypic decomposition

References 
 

 

Representation theory of Lie algebras